This is a list of current and former Roman Catholic churches in the Roman Catholic Diocese of Arlington. The diocese includes approximately 80 churches spread across the 21 northernmost counties and independent cities within the Commonwealth of Virginia. The cathedral church of the diocese is the Cathedral of St. Thomas More in Arlington, Virginia.

Deanery I

Deanery II

Deanery III

Deanery IV

Deanery V

Deanery VI

Deanery VII

References

 
Arlington